Gévrise Émane (born 27 July 1982) is a French judoka. She is the current European champion in the women's 63 kg weight class.

Emane first gained attention at the 2005 World Judo Championships in Cairo, Egypt where she won the silver medal in the women's 70 kg class. Next year, Emane won her first European title at the 2006 European Judo Championships in Tampere after an ippon in the final, against the German Heide Wollert.

Emane became the world champion for the first time at the 2007 World Judo Championships in Rio de Janeiro by defeating Ronda Rousey of United States by points in the final match. After moving down in weight to the 63 kg class in 2009, Emane claimed her second World Championship title at the 2011 World Judo Championships in Paris, where she beat two-time world champion Yoshie Ueno of Japan by unanimous decision in the final.

At the 2012 Summer Olympics, she won the bronze medal.

References

External links

 
 
 
 
 
 L'Equipe profile

Sportspeople from Yaoundé
French female judoka
Cameroonian emigrants to France
Olympic judoka of France
Judoka at the 2008 Summer Olympics
Judoka at the 2012 Summer Olympics
Judoka at the 2016 Summer Olympics
Living people
1982 births
Olympic bronze medalists for France
Olympic medalists in judo
Medalists at the 2012 Summer Olympics
Knights of the Ordre national du Mérite
European Games gold medalists for France
European Games medalists in judo
Judoka at the 2015 European Games
Universiade medalists in judo
Universiade gold medalists for France